Aram Mahmoud (born 15 July 1997) is a Syrian-born Dutch badminton player.

Escaping war and an absence of opportunity in Syria, the talented shuttler is trying to rebuild his game and make the Olympics against all odds.

Due to his situation and legal status, Mahmoud was unable to compete at international level from 2015 to 2018, but his rise through the rankings since then shows the desire he has to leave his mark on the sport.

He was selected as one of 29 members of the IOC Refugee Olympic Team to compete at 2020 Tokyo Olympics, the first badminton player to be participating at the Olympics as part of the IOC Refugee Team. He relocated to the Netherlands from Damascus, Syria in 2015 following unrest in his home country, and has since April 2018 been playing under the Dutch flag. He combines training with studying at the Johan Cruyff Academy and had previously won the Syrian men’s championship in 2013 and 2014, as well as the Arab Youth Championship.

Achievements

BWF International Challenge/Series (1 title) 
Men's singles

  BWF International Challenge tournament
  BWF International Series tournament
  BWF Future Series tournament

References 

Living people
1997 births
Syrian male badminton players
Syrian refugees
Dutch male badminton players
Badminton players at the 2020 Summer Olympics
Refugee Olympic Team at the 2020 Summer Olympics